"Ode to My Family" is a song by Irish band the Cranberries, released on 21 November 1994 as the second single from their second studio album, No Need to Argue (1994). The song was a hit in Oceania and several European countries, topping the charts in Iceland, and reaching number four in France, number five in Australia, and number eight in New Zealand. In 2017, the song was released as an acoustic, stripped down version on the band's Something Else album.

Composition
"Ode to My Family" is written in the key of D major with a tempo of 100 beats per minute. The entire piece follows the chord progression
4/4 |: D | Bm | F♯m | Gsus2 D/A :| ostinato.

Content
The song, written by singer Dolores O'Riordan and guitarist Noel Hogan, is about O'Riordan's yearning for her simple life as a child after having achieved success, and includes a string arrangement composed by O'Riordan.

Critical reception
Dave Sholin from the Gavin Report felt that O'Riordan's delivery "gives this song a special meaning, which makes for a compelling musical experience." Chuck Campbell from Knoxville News Sentinel said that the new album "offers a bucolic opening" in "Ode to My Family". Pan-European magazine Music & Media wrote, "Let Dolores be your station's guardian angel. Real Christmas family spirit is generated by this ballad which surpasses all the rest currently available when it comes to sincerity."  In 2018, Billboard and Stereogum ranked the song number eight and number four, respectively, on their lists of the top ten Cranberries songs.

Music video
The single's accompanying music video, shot in black-and-white, was directed by Samuel Bayer, who had also directed the band's video for their preceding single, "Zombie". Bayer stated on his Facebook account that the "Ode to My Family" music video was cut by Robert Duffy (video editor), and the "Zombie" video was cut by Eric Zumbrennen.

Track listings

 UK and Australian CD1
 "Ode to My Family"
 "So Cold in Ireland"
 "No Need to Argue" (live on the Later with Jools Holland, June 1994)
 "Dreaming My Dreams" (live on the Later with Jools Holland, June 1994)

 UK and Australian CD2
 "Ode to My Family" (live at Féile, Tipperary, 30 July 1994)
 "Dreams" (live at Féile, Tipperary, 30 July 1994)
 "Ridiculous Thoughts" (live at Féile, Tipperary, 30 July 1994)
 "Zombie" (live at Féile, Tipperary, 30 July 1994)

 UK 7-inch and cassette single
 "Ode to My Family"
 "So Cold in Ireland"

 US CD EP and Canadian CD single
 "Ode to My Family" (album version) – 4:32
 "So Cold in Ireland" – 4:43
 "Dreaming My Dreams" (live on the Later with Jools Holland, June 1994) – 3:52
 "Zombie" (live at Féile, Tipperary, 30 July 1994) – 5:17

Personnel
 Dolores O'Riordan – vocals, string arrangement
 Noel Hogan – electric and acoustic guitars
 Mike Hogan – bass guitar
 Fergal Lawler – drums and percussion

Charts and sales

Weekly charts

Year-end charts

Certifications and sales

References

The Cranberries songs
1990s ballads
1994 singles
1994 songs
Black-and-white music videos
Jangle pop songs
Music videos directed by Samuel Bayer
Number-one singles in Iceland
Pop ballads
Rock ballads
Song recordings produced by Stephen Street
Songs about families
Songs written by Dolores O'Riordan
Songs written by Noel Hogan